The 2021 MTV Video Music Awards were held on September 12, 2021, at the Barclays Center in Brooklyn, New York City. This marked the first time in eight years that the venue hosted the show. The show was hosted by hip-hop rapper and singer Doja Cat. It was the first time in history a Video of the Year nominee hosted the ceremony the same year.

The ceremony was simulcast on The CW, a free over-the-air broadcaster, with Mountain and Pacific time zones airing it live and others delayed for primetime, and on various ViacomCBS networks and platforms. Lil Nas X, Olivia Rodrigo and BTS were the most awarded artists of the night with three awards each, followed by Billie Eilish, and Justin Bieber with two each; the latter was also the most nominated artist with nine nominations. Beyoncé extended her lead as the most-awarded artist in the show's history, collecting her 29th trophy. Her daughter Blue Ivy Carter also became the youngest winner in the show's history.

On August 1, a new iteration of the MTV Video Music Awards "moon person" trophy was unveiled at NASA's Kennedy Space Center Visitor Complex, in honor of MTV's 40th anniversary. Designed by Kehinde Wiley, it features vines and flowers symbolizing "the ethnic histories that surround America", with the network stating that "each intertwined vine or leaf" holds a "different historical relevance, such as the seeds from African slaves, that are woven into the American tapestry".

MTV collaborated with 9/11 Day for a week of activities to "promote awareness and positive action" in honor of the 20th anniversary of the September 11 attacks, which fell on the eve of the ceremony.

The show received 3.7 million viewers across all networks, including 900,000 viewers on MTV, representing a 31% drop from last year’s 1.3 million. However, the show garnered 38 million interactions across all U.S. platforms, beating the Super Bowl for the first time and becoming 2021’s top telecast in social media buzz. Internationally, the VMAs increased 43% in Brazil and 25% in the U.K.

Performances
Lorde was initially announced as a performer for the main show on August 18, 2021, but later pulled out of the event on September 3 "due to a change in production elements". Ed Sheeran additionally performed his new single "Bad Habits", but the clip was uploaded to MTV's YouTube channel instead of being shown during the live broadcast. Anitta make a clip for the song "Girl from Rio" uploaded to MTV's YouTube channel as a advertisement for Burger King, but it was deleted.

Presenters
Presenters for the ceremony were announced on September 8, 2021. Nessa Diab and Jamila Mustafa hosted the 90-minute pre-show event, while Tinashe served as a special celebrity correspondent.

Pre-show
 Jamila Mustafa — presented Push Performance of the Year
 Tinashe and Bretman Rock — presented Group of the Year

Main show
 Madonna — opened the show
 Jennifer Lopez — presented Song of the Year
 Hailey Bieber — introduced Kacey Musgraves
 Cyndi Lauper — presented Best Pop
 Madison Beer — introduced the Extended Play Stage and Saint Jhn
 Rita Ora — introduced Ed Sheeran
 Billy Porter — introduced Lil Nas X and Jack Harlow
 Avril Lavigne — presented Video for Good
 Charli XCX — introduced Camila Cabello, Shawn Mendes and Tainy
 Leslie Grace — introduced Latto
 Simone Biles — introduced Doja Cat
 Conor McGregor — presented Artist of the Year
 Halle Bailey — introduced Chlöe
 Wyclef Jean — presented Best Hip-Hop
 Ciara — introduced Normani
 Fat Joe — introduced Ozuna
 Ashanti and Ja Rule — presented Best Collaboration
 AJ McLean, Lance Bass and Nick Lachey — presented Best K-Pop
 Billie Eilish — introduced Foo Fighters and presented the Global Icon Award to them
 SZA — introduced Alicia Keys and Swae Lee
 Tommy Lee — presented Best Alternative
 Doja Cat (host) — presented Best New Artist
 Swizz Beatz — introduced Busta Rhymes
 David Lee Roth — presented Video of the Year
 Megan Fox and Kourtney Kardashian — introduced Machine Gun Kelly and Travis Barker

Winners and nominees
Nominations were announced on August 11, 2021. Justin Bieber was the most-nominated artist with nine, followed by Megan Thee Stallion and BTS with seven. Voting for select categories began on the same day and took place on the VMA website until September 3. Voting for Best New Artist continued until during showtime. Social category nominations, including Group of the Year and Song of Summer, were announced on September 3, 2021. Voting for the former opened on September 4, while voting for the latter opened on September 7—both took place via MTV's Instagram stories. BTS, Olivia Rodrigo and Lil Nas X won the most awards of the night with three each, followed by Billie Eilish, Doja Cat, Silk Sonic and Bieber with two each.

Winners are listed first and in bold.

References

MTV Video Music
MTV Video Music Awards
MTV Video Music Awards
MTV Video Music Awards
MTV Video Music Awards ceremonies